Gumerovo (Ğümär) is a rural locality (a village) in Gorkovsky Selsoviet, Kushnarenkovsky District, Bashkortostan, Russia. The population was 184 as of 2010. There are 2 streets.

Geography 
Gumerovo is located 29 km northwest of Kushnarenkovo (the district's administrative centre) by road. Karacha-Yelga is the nearest rural locality.

References 

Rural localities in Kushnarenkovsky District